Isotopic analysis by nuclear magnetic resonance allows the user to quantify with great precision the differences of isotopic contents on each site of a molecule and thus to measure the specific natural isotope fractionation for each site of this molecule. The SNIF-NMR analytical method was developed to detect the (over) sugaring of wine and enrichment of grape musts, and is mainly used to check the authenticity of foodstuffs (such as wines, spirits, fruit juice, honey, sugar and vinegar) and to control the naturality of some aromatic molecules (such as vanillin, benzaldehyde, raspberry ketone and anethole). The SNIF-NMR method has been adopted by the International Organisation of Vine and Wine (OIV) and the European Union as an official method for wine analysis. It is also an official method adopted by the Association Of Analytical Chemists (AOAC) for analysis of fruit juices, maple syrup, vanillin, and by the European Committee for Standardization (CEN) for vinegar.

Background 

 1981: Invention of the SNIF-NMR method by Professor Gerard Martin, Maryvonne Martin and their team at the University of Nantes / CNRS 
 1987: Creation of Eurofins Nantes Laboratories - specializing in wine analysis, and purchase of operating the CNRS patent rights (this patent is now public and the name “SNIF-NMR” is now a registered trademark
The OIV adopts it as an official method
 1987-1990: Eurofins Laboratories apply the SNIF-NMR method to the analysis of fruit juices and certain natural flavors
 1990: The SNIF-NMR method is recognized by the European Union as an official method for the analysis of wines

→ Implementation of the SNIF-NMR method for official laboratories in Europe
 1990-1992: the method is tested on aromatic molecules
 1996: The SNIF- NMR method is recognized in the United States by the AOAC for fruit juices

→ Implementation of the SNIF-NMR< method for official laboratories in US
 2001: The SNIF-NMR< method is recognized by the AOAC for vanillin
 2013: The SNIF-NMR method is recognized by the CEN for acetic acid
→ Implementation of the SNIF-NMR method for official laboratories in Asia

Principle

Isotopic distribution 

The atoms hydrogen, oxygen, and carbon co-exist naturally in specific proportions with their stable isotopes, 2H (or D), 18O and 13C respectively, in different proportions as shown in the figure 2 below.

The amount and distribution of the different isotopes in a molecule is influenced by: 
 Environmental (climatic and geographical) conditions - for natural products 
 Chemical or biochemical processes such as the photosynthetic metabolism in plants

This phenomenon is known as natural isotopic fractionation (see Figure 3). The resulting isotopic fingerprint can provide information on the origin - botanical, synthetic, geographical - of the molecule or product.

General principle 

The Principle of the SNIF-NMR is built on: “The Natural Isotopic Fractionation”. Routinely for food authenticity, two nuclei are used:
 The Hydrogen nuclei: 2H-SNIF-NMR method was the initial application of SNIF-NMR, it measures the ratio of deuterium/hydrogen on each site of a sample molecule
 The Carbon nuclei: 13C-SNIF-NMR method has opened new possibilities of analysis by SNIF-NMR (new molecules and new applications). This method will use the ratios of 13C over 12C on each site of a molecule

Steps of the method 

The SNIF-NMR is applied on pure (or purified) molecules. Therefore, some preparation steps may be required in the lab before analysis.
For example, for the SNIF-NMR of ethanol, according to official methods:
 Fermentation (for fruit juice)
 Quantitative extraction of ethanol by distillation 
 Standardized preparation of NMR samples
 NMR acquisition
 Interpretation of results and report on the authenticity

At each step of the SNIF-NMR analysis, efforts should be made to avoid parasite isotopic fractionation. Control measures such as determining the alcoholic strength of the intermediate products of the analysis (fermented juice or distillate) are performed on each sample.

Advantages of the method 

The isotopic ratios of a molecule can also be determined by isotope ratio mass spectrometry (IRMS), sample quantity for IRMS is much lower than for NMR, and there is the possibility of coupling the mass spectrometer to a chromatographic system to enable on-line purification or analyses of several components of a complex mixture. However the sample is burnt after a physical transformation such as combustion or pyrolysis. Therefore, it gives a mean value of the concentration of the isotope studied between all sites of the molecule.  IRMS is the official AOAC technique used for the average ratio 13C/12C (or δ13C) of sugars or ethanol, and the official CEN and OIV method for the 18O/16O in water.

The SNIF-NMR method (Site-Specific Natural Isotope Fractionation studied by Nuclear Magnetic Resonance) is able to determine, to a high level of accuracy, the isotopic ratios for each of the sites of the molecule, which enables a better discrimination. For example, for ethanol (CH3CH2OH), the three ratios ((D/H)CH3, (D/H)CH2 and (D/H)OH) can be obtained.

Examples of applications of 2H-SNIF-NMR

Application for fruit juice and maple syrup 

AOAC Official Method for detecting the addition of sugar in a fruit juice or in maple syrup. It is the only reliable method to detect addition of C3 sugar (ex: beet sugar).

NMR Spectrum (example of the 2H-SNIF-NMR) 

Ethanol molecules obtained after complete fermentation of the sugar coexists with 3 naturally monodeuterated isotopomers (CH2D-CH2-OH, CH3-CHDOH and-CH3-CH2OD). Their presence can then be quantified with relative precision.

On the following 2H-NMR spectrum (Figure 8), a peak corresponds to one of the three observed isotopomers of ethanol. 
In the AOAC official method, the ratios of (D/H)CH3 and (D/H)CH2 are calculated by comparison with an Internal standard, tetramethylurea (TMU), with a certified (D/H) value.

Interpretation of SNIF-NMR isotopic values 

The following Figure 9 summarizes the principle of interpretation of:

 Results measured by IRMS (isotopic deviation of δ 13C), which enables discrimination of plants according to their CO2 photosynthetic metabolism (C4 like can or maize versus C3 like beet, orange or grape)
 With results measured by SNIF-NMR ((D / H)I ) that can differentiate the botanical origin of sugars within the same metabolic group (beet versus orange or grape)

Values obtained on a test sample are then compared with the values of authentic samples (Database).

Application for authenticity of wines 

SNIF-NMR is the official method of the OIV to determine the authentication of wine origin. It is the only method to detect C3 sugar addition (like beet sugar).

The isotopic parameters of both water and ethanol are related to the humidity and temperature of the growing region of the plant. Therefore, considerations of meteorological data of the region and of the year help to make a diagnosis. In the case of wine and fruits, the isotopic parameters of ethanol have been shown to respond even to subtle environmental variations and they efficiently characterize the region of production,.

Since 1991, an isotopic data bank is built in the Joint Research Centre of the European Commission (EC-JRC) concerning wines of all European members. The database contains several thousand entries for European wines  and is maintained and updated every year. This database is accessible for all official public laboratories. Private companies involved in food and beverage controls have also collected authentic samples and built up specific data banks.

Thus, by comparing the specific natural isotope fractionation corresponding to each site of a molecule of ethanol of wine with that of a molecule known and referenced in a database.  The geographical origin, botany and method of production of the ethanol molecule and thus the authenticity of wine can be checked.

Application for vinegar and acetic acid 

The origins of vinegars obtained by bacterial or chemical oxidation of ethanol resulting from the fermentation of various sugars can be identified by the 2H-SNIF-NMR. It allows to control the quality of vinegar and to determine if it comes from sugar cane, wine, malt, cider, and alcohol or from a chemical synthesis.

Application for vanillin 

2H-SNIF-NMR is the official AOAC method for determining the natural vanillin.

The abundance of five monodeuterated isotopomers for vanillin can be measured by 2H-SNIF-NMR. The vanillin molecule is represented in figure 11, all observable sites for which the site specific deuterium concentrations can be measured are referenced with a number.

As for the wine or the fruit, the interpretation of results in terms of origin is done by comparison of the isotopic parameters of the sample analyzed with those from a group of referenced molecules of known origin. 
It appears that all the origins of vanillin are well discriminated using 2H-NMR data. Particularly, vanillin ex-bean can well be distinguished from the other sources, as we can see in figure 12 below.

Additionally, this method is the only one to discriminate between natural and biosynthetic sources of vanillin.

Application for other aromas 

The naturality of different aroma can also be checked using SNIF-NMR: for example for anethole, abundance of only six monodeuterated isotopomers can be measured by 2H-SNIF-NMR that allows differentiating the botanical origins fennel, star anise or pine.

Other applications:
The SNIF-NMR applied to benzaldehyde can detect adulterated bitter almond and cinnamon oils. It is demonstrated that the site specific deuterium contents of benzaldehyde allow the determination of the origin of the molecule: synthetic (ex-toluene and ex-benzal chloride), natural (ex-kernels from apricots, peaches, cherries and ex-bitter almond) and semisynthetic (ex-cinnamaldehyde extracted from cinnamon).
Other applications have also been published: raspberry ketone), heliotropine, ...

13C-SNIF-NMR 

As described in the work of E. Tenailleau and S. Akoka, an optimization of the technique parameters have enabled to reach a better accuracy for the 13C NMR measurements).

The 13C-SNIF-NMR method is called method “new frontier” because it is the first analytical method that can differentiate sugars coming from C4-metabolism plants (cane, maize, etc.) and some crassulacean acid metabolism plants (CAM-metabolism) like pineapple or agave.

This method can also be applied to tequila products, where it can differentiate authentic 100% agave tequila, misto tequila (made from at least 51% agave), and products made from a larger proportion of cane or maize sugar and therefore not complying with the legal definition of tequila.

This method will certainly have further applications in future, in the field of food and beverage analysis authenticity.

References

See also
 Nuclear magnetic resonance
 Food chemistry
 Food security

Nuclear magnetic resonance
Isotopes
Food security
Analytical chemistry